Red Lake Falls is the name of several places in the United States:

Red Lake Falls, Minnesota
Red Lake Falls Township, Red Lake County, Minnesota